Drôle de Félix (literally meaning Comedy of Félix or Amazing Félix; also known as  (The) Adventures of Felix) is a 2000 French film, a road movie written and directed by Olivier Ducastel and Jacques Martineau. It stars Sami Bouajila as the title character.

Plot 
Félix,  a young gay man of Arab descent, living in Dieppe, is currently unemployed and HIV positive. While cleaning out the apartment of his recent deceased mother, he discovers that the father he never knew is living in Marseilles. Félix decides to hitchhike south to meet him, promising to see his lover Daniel there five days later.

Carrying with him only a small bag, his HIV medication and a rainbow kite, Félix takes to the road. He witnesses a racist attack and is beaten up by one of the assailants. He is unable, however, to bring himself to report it to the police. Later, Félix encounters a series of people who form an alternative family for him: a young gay man studying art, who Félix teaches to draw,  a lone old widow, who shelters him in her house, a handsome railroad worker, with whom he has a brief sexual encounter, a mother of three children by three different fathers, and a kind, middle aged fisherman. As he calls each of these characters "brother", "cousin", "grandmother" and the like, he gradually constructs a sort of family and new understandings of life through this odyssey, no matter whether he actually meets his "true" father at the end of the story.

Félix is haunted by the racist crime he witnessed, in which he learns, the victim died, and in his inability to do anything about it. Stopping at a hotel, he sees the police arresting the murderer. When he arrives at Marseilles, Felix decides not to see his father and goes instead on a romantic holiday to Tunisia with his lover.

Cast 
Sami Bouajila as Félix
Patachou as Mathilde Firmin
Ariane Ascaride as Isabelle
Pierre-Loup Rajot as Daniel
Charly Sergue as Jules
Maurice Bénichou as Fisherman
Philippe Garziano as Railroader
Didier Mahieu as Friend / Unionist

Rating 
The film is not rated by the Motion Picture Association of America.  The British Board of Film Classification classified the film as "15" (suitable for individuals 15 or older).  It received a rating of "U" (approved for all audiences) by the French Ministry of Culture.

Reception
Review aggregation website Rotten Tomatoes reported an approval rating of 69%, based on 39 reviews, with an average score of 6.3/10. At Metacritic, which assigns a normalized rating out of 100 to reviews from mainstream critics, the film received an average score of 63, based on 16 reviews, indicating "generally favorable reviews".

Accolades

References

External links 
 
 Drôle de Félix review

2000 films
2000 LGBT-related films
French LGBT-related films
French road movies
2000s road movies
Films directed by Olivier Ducastel
Films directed by Jacques Martineau
HIV/AIDS in French films
Gay-related films
2000s French films